The 1922 Kansas gubernatorial election was held on November 7, 1922. Democratic nominee Jonathan M. Davis defeated Republican nominee William Yoast Morgan with 50.87% of the vote.

General election

Candidates
Major party candidates 
Jonathan M. Davis, Democratic
William Yoast Morgan, Republican

Other candidates
M. L. Phillips, Socialist

Results

References

1922
Kansas
Gubernatorial